Abhay may refer to:

Films and television
 Abhay (1994 film) (English title: The Fearless), an Indian children's film
 Abhay (2001 film) (Tamil title: Aalavandhan), an Indian Hindi action thriller
 Abhay (2009 film), an Indian Kannada romantic action film
 Abhay (TV series), an Indian crime web series

Places
 Abhayagiri Buddhist Monastery
 Abhayagiri Dagaba, an extensive ruins in Anuradhapura, Sri Lanka
 Abhayapuri, a town in Assam

People
 Abhay Ashtekar (born 1949), professor of physics at Pennsylvania State University
 Abhay Bharadwaj (1954–2020), Indian politician
 A. C. Bhaktivedanta Swami Prabhupada or Abhay Charan De (1896–1977), founder of the International Society for Krishna Consciousness
 Abhay Deol (born 1976), Indian actor
 Abhay Kumar (born 1980), diplomat, writer, poet, artist
 Abhay Sopori (born 1979), musician
 Kouprasith Abhay, Laotian general
 Abhay, Indian maoist

Other uses
 Abhay IFV, an infantry fighting vehicle developed by DRDO 
 INS Abhay (P33)
 Abhayamudra, a pose that Hindu gods are often depicted in

See also
 Abhaya (disambiguation)
 

Indian masculine given names
Nepalese masculine given names